William Tell (Italian: Guglielmo Tell) is a 1949 Italian historical drama film directed by Giorgio Pastina and Michał Waszyński and starring Gino Cervi, Monique Orban and Paul Muller. The film is based on Friedrich Schiller's 1804 play of the same title, which portrays the adventures of William Tell in his fight for Swiss independence. The film was produced by the Milan-based Fauno Film.

Cast
Gino Cervi as Guglielmo Tell
Monique Orban as Berta - la castellana 
Paul Muller as Gessler, the bailiff
Raf Pindi as Rudolf the Harra
Allegra Sander as Mathilde
Gabriele Ferzetti as Corrado Hant
Danielle Benson as Hedwig Tell
Renato De Carmine as Bertrando
Emilio Baldanello
Enrico Olivieri as William Tell
Laura Bigi
Aldo Nicodemi as Rudens
Barbara Deperusse as Wife of a lumberjack
Giovanni Lovatelli
Alberto Collo

References

External links

Italian historical films
1940s historical films
Films set in Switzerland
Films set in the 14th century
Italian films based on plays
Films based on works by Friedrich Schiller
Films directed by Giorgio Pastina
Italian black-and-white films
Cultural depictions of William Tell
1940s Italian films